Jesús Feliciano (born June 6, 1979) is a Puerto Rican former professional baseball outfielder and coach. He was most recently the first base coach for the Los Angeles Angels of the Major League Baseball (MLB). He played in MLB for the New York Mets.

Professional career

Los Angeles Dodgers
Feliciano was originally picked in the 36th round of the 1997 Major League Baseball draft by the Los Angeles Dodgers as a draft-and-follow player. He signed in May  and debuted as a professional with the short-season Yakima Bears that summer. He batted .305 with 26 RBI, and stole 34 bases in 44 attempts in 77 games, finishing four steals behind Northwest League leader Juan Pierre. Feliciano led the Northwest League in at-bats with 302, outfield putouts with 191, and outfield double plays.

In , Feliciano played for the Advanced-A Vero Beach Dodgers and he stole 20 bases in 30 tries. He fielded .996, leading California League outfielders.

Feliciano spent  back at Vero Beach and hit .262, stealing 22 bases in 32 attempts. Feliciano again led his league's outfielders in fielding percentage, this time handling 284 chances without an error.

Feliciano struggled in  playing for the Jacksonville Suns, only batting .237 in 100 games. He hit .300 that winter for the Cangrejeros de Santurce in the Puerto Rico Baseball League.

He began  even worse than he had done in the summer of '02, hitting .138 and 4 RBI in 37 games. He was released by Dodgers on May 29.

Tampa Bay Devil Rays
He later was signed by the Tampa Bay Devil Rays where he played in 72 games for the Double-A Orlando Rays. He also played for Montgomery Biscuits and in 68 games for the High Class-A Bakersfield Blaze.

Washington Nationals
He was signed by the Washington Nationals organization and played for the Harrisburg Senators. He also spent time with the Oaxaca Warriors in the Mexican League.

New York Mets

On June 7, 2010, the New York Mets selected the contract of the 31-year-old outfielder. He went to Puerto Rico to play against the Florida Marlins in a three-game series. He had been leading the International League in hitting with a batting average of .385. On July 12, he was demoted for the return of the injured Carlos Beltrán. On August 22, 2010, he was called up from the Triple-A Buffalo Bisons to take the place of Rod Barajas.

When the Mets traded Jeff Francoeur to the Texas Rangers, Jesus was sent down to the Minors again to make room for rookie outfielder Lucas Duda.

On November 5, 2010, Feliciano was sent down to the minors to the Triple-A Buffalo Bisons, then became a free agent after refusing the minor league assignment.

Tampa Bay Rays
The Tampa Bay Rays signed Feliciano to a minor league contract on January 19, 2012.

International career

Caribbean Series
In the 2009 Caribbean Series, he played for the Leones de Ponce.

Puerto Rico Winter League
In the 2009–2010 season he played with the Lobos de Arecibo. In the 2011–2012 season he played with the league champions Indios de Mayagüez.

World Baseball Classic
He was selected to play on the Puerto Rican national team for the 2009 World Baseball Classic, where he was the starting left fielder alongside major leaguers Carlos Beltrán and Alex Ríos.

Coaching career
He joined the Chicago Cubs organization after retiring and replaced Bill Buckner as hitting coach for the Boise Hawks in 2014. He was the hitting coach for the South Bend Cubs in 2015. He served as the Eugene Emeralds manager in 2016 and 2017. He led his club to the Northwest League championship in 2016 and won 2016 Northwest League Manager of the Year. He served as hitting coach for the Tennessee Smokies in 2018. 

Prior to the 2019 season, he was hired by the Los Angeles Angels as their first base and outfield coach. On December 20, 2020, it was announced that Feliciano would not return to the Angels coaching staff in 2021.

See also
 List of Major League Baseball players from Puerto Rico

Notes

External links

1979 births
Living people
Bakersfield Blaze players
Binghamton Mets players
Buffalo Bisons (minor league) players
Cangrejeros de Santurce (baseball) players
Diablos Rojos del México players
Durham Bulls players
Eugene Emeralds managers
Guerreros de Oaxaca players
Harrisburg Senators players
Jacksonville Suns players
Liga de Béisbol Profesional Roberto Clemente outfielders
Los Angeles Angels coaches
Major League Baseball first base coaches
Major League Baseball outfielders
Major League Baseball players from Puerto Rico
Mexican League baseball center fielders
Minor league baseball coaches
Montgomery Biscuits players
New Orleans Zephyrs players
New York Mets players
Orlando Rays players
Sportspeople from Bayamón, Puerto Rico
Puerto Rican expatriate baseball players in Mexico
Rojos del Águila de Veracruz players
San Bernardino Stampede players
Vero Beach Dodgers players
Yakima Bears players
2009 World Baseball Classic players
2013 World Baseball Classic players
Atenienses de Manatí (baseball) players
Gigantes de Carolina players
Indios de Mayagüez players
Lobos de Arecibo players
Senadores de San Juan players
Puerto Rican expatriate baseball players in Venezuela